The 2022–23 S.V. Zulte Waregem season is the club's 22nd season in existence and the 18th consecutive season in the top flight of Belgian football. In addition to the domestic league, Zulte Waregem will participate in this season's edition of the Belgian Cup. The season covers the period from 1 July 2022 to 30 June 2023.

Players

First-team squad

Other players under contract

Pre-season and friendlies

Competitions

Overview

Belgian Pro League

League table

Results summary

Results by round

Matches
The league fixtures were announced on 22 June 2022.

Belgian Cup

References

Zulte Waregem